Robert Liddell was a writer.

Robert Liddell may also refer to:

Robert Liddell (Pittsburgh) (1837–1893), mayor of Pittsburgh
Robert Scotland Liddell (1885–1972), journalist